Neoclinus lacunicola is a species of chaenopsid blenny found around Japan, in the northwest Pacific ocean. It can reach a maximum length of  TL.

References
 Fukao, R., 1980 (Feb.) Review of Japanese fishes of the genus Neoclinus with description of two new species and notes on habitat preference. Publications of Seto Marine Biological Laboratory v. 25 (no. 1/4): 175–209, Pls. 1–2.

lacunicola
Fish described in 1980